Rosie Mac (born 12 February 1997) is an actress, model and singer from England. She was the body double for Emilia Clarke in her portrayal of Daenerys Targaryen in season five of the HBO series Game of Thrones.

Career
In 2015, Rosie Mac was the body double for Emilia Clarke on Game of Thrones during the show's fifth season.

Rosie Mac played the lead role in the live action film Little Mermaid (2016).

Rosie Mac co-founded and owns the Mac Model & Casting Agency.

Filmography

Film

TV Series

References

External links
 
 

21st-century English actresses
1997 births
Living people